Caught is the third album by singer, songwriter, producer and composer Teri DeSario, released in 1980 by Casablanca Records and Filmworks Inc. (NBLP-7231).

The 1980 album contains the songs "All I Wanna Do" and "Time After Time".

Background
After achieving some moderate success with her previous album Moonlight Madness, DeSario's label suggested to her that she make a rock album with the cream of Los Angeles session musicians to rival rising stars like Pat Benatar and Kim Carnes. Since the label was willing to let her keyboardist/songwriter/producer husband handle the project, she readily agreed, and decided to call the album Caught, after the first track on it.

Caught saw low sales, and would not receive the radio airplay of DeSario's previous two efforts. Kerrang! journalist Paul Suter later included the title track on the 'Striktly for Konnoisseurs' compilation he put together a few years later.

Track listing

Side one
 "Caught" – 4:12
 "Time After Time" – 3:44
 "I'm with You Now" – 3:48
 "Standin' on the Edge" – 5:00

Side two
 "Hittin' Below the Belt" – 3:40
 "I've Got a Secret" – 3:34
 "All I Wanna Do" – 3:19
 "I Hate You" – 3:56
 "I Should Have Known Better" – 3:20

Personnel
Producer – Bill Purse
Executive producer – H.W. Casey
Engineering – Humberto Gatica
Assistants – Jeff Borgeson, Ernie Sheesley, Peggie McCreary and Steven McNanus
Mastering – Bernie Grundman at A&M Studios, Los Angeles, CA.
Guitars – Steve Lukather, Richie Zito, Michael Landau, Mitch Holder
Drums – Mike Baird, Carlos Vega
Keyboards – Bill Purse, James Newton Howard, Steve Porcaro, David Foster, Michael Boddicker
Background vocals – Joey Carbone, Bill Purse, Teri DeSario, John Joyce, Jim Haas, Bruce Hornsby
Percussion – Paulinho DaCosta

Additional album credits

Side one
Teri DeSario, Joey Carbone
Teri DeSario, Joey Carbone, Richie Zito, Bill Purse
Desmond Child
Richie Zito

Side two
Mark Aguilar, Bill Purse
Bill Purse
Teri DeSario, Joey Carbone
Tom Keanne, Mike Himelstein
Paul McCartney, John Lennon

References

External links
 Teri Desario Facebook Site
 Teri and KC 'Yes, I’m Ready' video

Teri DeSario albums
1980 albums
Casablanca Records albums

ja:テリー・デサリオ